The second government of Francisco Franco was formed on 9 August 1939, following the end of the Spanish Civil War.

Coming to be known under various labels by the francoist-controlled media (such as the "Government of Peace" or the "Government of Victory"), the cabinet was made up of members from the different factions or "families" within the National Movement: mainly the FET y de las JONS party—the only legal political party during the Francoist regime—the military, the National Catholic Association of Propagandists (ACNP) and a number of aligned-nonpartisan figures from the civil service. The cabinet saw a large number of changes throughout its tenure, with two major cabinet reshuffles taking place in May 1941 and September 1942.

Council of Ministers
The Council of Ministers was structured into the office for the prime minister and 15 ministries, including two ministers without portfolio.

Departmental structure
Francisco Franco's second government was organised into several superior and governing units, whose number, powers and hierarchical structure varied depending on the ministerial department.

Unit/body rank
() Undersecretary
() Director-general
() Military & intelligence agency

Notes

References

Bibliography

External links
Governments. Dictatorship of Franco (18.07.1936 / 20.11.1975). CCHS–CSIC (in Spanish).
Governments of Franco. Dictatorship Chronology (1939–1975). Fuenterrebollo Portal (in Spanish).
The governments of the Civil War and Franco's dictatorship (1936–1975). Lluís Belenes i Rodríguez History Page (in Spanish).
Biographies. Royal Academy of History (in Spanish).

1939 establishments in Spain
1945 disestablishments in Spain
Cabinets established in 1939
Cabinets disestablished in 1945
Council of Ministers (Spain)